The Meadows Frozen Custard is a franchise founded on July 4th 1950 that specializes in frozen custard.

History
Delbert Meadows opened a small custard stand in Duncansville, Pennsylvania. After decades of business, the Meadows brothers decided to add batting cages, mini golf, and go-karts to their location. Now considered a landmark in western Pennsylvania, the Duncansville location is still in operation and owned by Dick, Jay and Joel Meadows, sons of Delbert Meadows.

Original Frozen Custard
The frozen custard is an original recipe that has been in the Meadows family for decades. On July 4th 1950 the Meadows brothers, J.V., Richard and Delbert, worked with Rush A. Turner, mix-master and ice cream department supervisor, of Sealtest located in Altoona, Pennsylvania to come up with a unique frozen custard recipe that is still used today. When Seal-Test dairy went out of business the recipe was then transferred to Galliker's Dairy who is now in charge of the production. The Meadows menu includes shakes, sundaes, arctic swirls, banana splits, root beer floats, strawberry shortcakes, smoothies, and cones.

Current
In 2003, the Meadows brothers (Dick, Jay, and Joe) sold the Meadows franchise to Gardner Meadows Inc. Since the purchase of the Meadows franchise, Gardner Meadows Inc. has opened 12 franchises and have 9 in current development. These franchises are located across Pennsylvania and Maryland. Demand has caused more franchises to form, each individually owned and operated. Over fifty years later each Meadows location still serves the same recipe that got its start in 1950. Locations include: Bedford, Pennsylvania, Bethlehem, Pennsylvania, Carlisle, Pennsylvania, Chambersburg, Pennsylvania, Clarion, Pennsylvania, Clearfield, Pennsylvania, Columbia, Maryland,  Cranberry Township, Pennsylvania, DuBois, Pennsylvania, Ebensburg, Pennsylvania, Enola, Pennsylvania, Frederick, Maryland, Greensburg, Pennsylvania, Greenwood (Altoona), Pennsylvania, Hagerstown, Maryland, Harrisburg, Pennsylvania, Hollidaysburg (Duncansville), Pennsylvania, Huntingdon, Pennsylvania, Indiana, Pennsylvania, Johnstown, Pennsylvania, Monroeville, Pennsylvania, Oak Ridge, North Carolina, Waynesboro, Pennsylvania, York, Pennsylvania, Ashburn, Virginia. The original location in Hollidaysburg is currently being rebuilt, opening April 18, 2014.

Australia's first store opened in Franklin (Canberra) in 2016.

In 2008 Travel Channel program "Taste of America" visited the Meadows to film a special segment on the frozen custard stand.  The episode was broadcast Wednesday, May 7, 2008 at 11:00 p.m. EST on The Travel Channel.  Show host Mark DeCarlo and crew visited The Meadows to get a taste of The Meadows' famous frozen custard. DeCarlo visited with the Meadows family and many of the firm's loyal customers. DeCarlo and his crew also got an inside peek into the manufacturing of the product, product preparation, and customer service.

See also
 List of frozen custard companies

References

External links
Meadows Frozen Custard Official Website
Developments: Meadows Original Frozen Custard coming to town, Pittsburgh Tribune-Review, June 23, 2004, by Rick Stouffer
Hagerstown Magazine Article
Company Profile

Restaurants in Pennsylvania
Economy of the Eastern United States
Restaurants established in 1950
Fast-food franchises
Ice cream parlors
Frozen custard
Cuisine of the Mid-Atlantic states